Ivan Kinčík (born 17 September 1984) is a Slovak former competitive figure skater. He represented Slovakia at four World Junior Championships and one European Championship. He reached the free skate at the 2003 World Junior Championships in Ostrava, Czech Republic.

Programs

Competitive highlights

References

External links 
 

1984 births
Slovak male single skaters
Living people
Figure skaters from Bratislava